Double Platinum is a 1999 American made-for-television musical drama film starring Diana Ross and Brandy.

Plot
The film tells the story of a woman who reluctantly leaves her overbearing husband and infant child to pursue a career in the music industry. Aspiring vocalist, Olivia King (Diana Ross) performs at small lounge in Atlanta, Georgia in 1981. Following her performance,  she is approached by a music executive who advises her of the myriad opportunities awaiting her in the larger music market of New York City. Initially, King declines his offer, returning home to her husband (Brian Stokes Mitchell), who dismisses the idea of her relocating and general career aspirations. Feeling depressed, conflicted and trapped in her marriage, Olivia King leaves her home in the middle of the night, promising to return for her daughter.

Eighteen years later, in St. Louis, Missouri, King's daughter, Kayla Harris (Brandy Norwood), now 19 years old, has won a contest to meet famous superstar Olivia King, of whom Kayla is a huge fan. Following Olivia's concert, Olivia and Kayla share a meal, during which Kayla details her own musical aspirations and invites Olivia to one of her performance at a small local club. When Kayla returns home from dinner, her father is shocked to learn that the star Kayla got to meet was Olivia King, but, does not tell Kayla the truth of maternal parentage. The next day, Kayla's father confronts Olivia at her concert venue, warning her to stay away from their daughter. At Kayla's performance, she worries that Olivia will not appear, but, she does, shortly after Kayla begins to sing. Following the show, Olivia reveals to Kayla that she is her mother. Kayla is stunned, upset, and quickly leaves the club. Kayla is shaken, argues with her father, and refuses to speak to Olivia, even when she offers to help her with her career. Kayla's best friend advises her to accept Olivia's help with her music career, as it is the least she owes her.

Kayla reluctantly agrees to go to New York City with Olivia, who makes futile attempts to build a relationship with her daughter. Olivia introduces Kayla to her industry contacts, and with Olivia's strong recommendation and Kayla's talent, she is quickly signed to a recording contract. While beginning to record her first album, Kayla continues to live with Olivia in her penthouse apartment, with Olivia trying not to behave like an overbearing stage mother as she pursues success. Kayla then begins a steamy romance with a handsome older music executive, Ric Ortega (Allen Payne) whom her mother does not trust and warns against, but, Kayla ignores her mother. Despite her growing success and initial hit single, Have You Ever?, Kayla continues to harbor bitter feelings towards Olivia, which boil over during their record label's Grammy Party. After Kayla's performance, Olivia is asked to perform by the head of the label, causing Kayla to resent her mother for "stealing her spotlight". Kayla's moves in with Ric. However, after discovering that Ric revealed her true parentage to the press and betrayed her, just as her mother had warned, Kayla dissolves their relationship. Kayla, feeling regretful, follows her mother to her cabin, where Olivia is finding refuge from the scandal. As they spend time at the cabin and truly communicate for the first time, the women begin to finally understand each other. Eventually, Kayla processes her feelings about her mother and her decision to leave the family. The movie closes with Olivia and Kayla returning to St. Louis for a concert Kayla is giving. As the show draws to a close, she calls her mother to the stage and they perform the duet, Love Is All That Matters. Kayla's friend and family look on from the audience.

The movie was a Nielsen ratings success, debuting at #16 for the week. Initially airing on ABC, the telefilm has since been syndicated by VH1, MTV, BET, Centric and TV One (U.S. TV channel) where it still is a recurrent favorite.

Cast

 Diana Ross as Olivia King
 Brandy as Kayla Harris
 Christine Ebersole as Peggy
 Allen Payne as Ric Ortega
 Brian Stokes Mitchell as Adam Harris
 Harvey Fierstein as Gary Millstein
 Roger Rees as Marc Reckler
 Samantha Brown as Royana
 Ed Lover as Party Ardie
 Peter Francis James as Martin Holly
 Adriane Lenox
 Bernard Addison
 Debbie Matenopoulos as Herself

Soundtrack
The songs featured in the film are from Brandy's and Diana's most recent albums:

Brandy (from Never Say Never in 1998) - Have You Ever, Almost Doesn't Count, and Happy.

Diana Ross (from Every Day Is a New Day in 1999) - He Lives In You, Until We Meet Again, Carry On, and Someone That You Loved Before.

"Love Is All That Matters" was an original song performed by Brandy and Diana specifically for the film.

References

http://www.allmovie.com/movie/double-platinum-v179897/cast-crew
https://www.youtube.com/watch?v=4hpeyGrwdsw
https://web.archive.org/web/20140329002832/http://grooveshark.com/#!/album/Double+Platinum+Soundtrack/4456250
https://itunes.apple.com/ca/album/never-say-never/id20913004

External links
 
 

1999 films
1999 television films
1990s musical drama films
African-American musical drama films
Films about music and musicians
1999 drama films
Films directed by Robert Allan Ackerman
American drama television films
1990s English-language films
1990s American films